Carlisle is an unincorporated community in Fayette County, West Virginia, United States.

The community takes its name after Carlisle, England, the ancestral home of an early settler.

References

Unincorporated communities in Fayette County, West Virginia
Unincorporated communities in West Virginia
Coal towns in West Virginia